Saint-Pierre-les-Étieux is a commune in the Cher department in the Centre-Val de Loire region of France.

Geography

Population

Sights
 The church of St. Pierre, dating from the twelfth century.
 A fifteenth-century manorhouse.
 Two eighteenth-century houses.
 An old stone cross.
 A watermill.

See also
Communes of the Cher department

References

External links

Annuaire Mairie website 

Communes of Cher (department)